The 2016 Red Rock Pro Open was a professional tennis tournament played on outdoor hard courts. It was the 8th edition of the tournament and part of the 2016 ITF Women's Circuit, offering a total of $50,000 in prize money. It took place in Las Vegas, United States, on 26 September–2 October 2016.

Singles main draw entrants

Seeds 

 1 Rankings as of 19 September 2016.

Other entrants 
The following player received a wildcard into the singles main draw:
  Sophie Chang
  Sofia Kenin
  Melanie Oudin
  Maria Sanchez

The following players received entry from the qualifying draw:
  Marie Bouzková
  Julia Elbaba
  Fanny Stollár
  Anna Zaja

The following player received entry by a lucky loser spot:
  Kayla Day

Champions

Singles

 Alison Van Uytvanck def.  Sofia Kenin, 3–6, 7–6(7–4), 6–2

Doubles

 Michaëlla Krajicek /  Maria Sanchez def.  Jamie Loeb /  Chanel Simmonds, 7–5, 6–1

External links 
 2016 Red Rock Pro Open at ITFtennis.com
 Official website

2016 ITF Women's Circuit
2016 in American tennis
 
2016